John McKinney (1829 – October 12, 1871) was a United States district judge of the United States District Court for the Southern District of Florida.

Education and career

Born in Lycoming County, Pennsylvania, McKinney graduated from the College of New Jersey (now Princeton University) with an Artium Baccalaureus degree in 1848. He read law in 1850. He served as a clerk in the Solicitor's Office of the United States Department of the Treasury in Washington, D.C., beginning in 1861.

Federal judicial service

McKinney received a recess appointment from President Ulysses S. Grant on November 8, 1870, to a seat on the United States District Court for the Southern District of Florida vacated by Judge Thomas Jefferson Boynton. He was nominated to the same position by President Grant on December 7, 1870. He was confirmed by the United States Senate on February 18, 1871, and received his commission the same day. His service terminated on October 12, 1871, due to his death.

References

Sources
 

1829 births
1871 deaths
Judges of the United States District Court for the Southern District of Florida
United States federal judges appointed by Ulysses S. Grant
19th-century American judges
United States federal judges admitted to the practice of law by reading law